Record of Lodoss War: Advent of Cardice (Record of Lodoss War in North America and Europe) is an action role-playing game developed by Neverland for the Dreamcast. It was released in Japan on June 29, 2000; in Europe on December 15, 2000; and in North America on March 14, 2001. Based on the anime series of the same name, it would be the only Lodoss video game to be released outside Japan until the release of Deedlit in Wonder Labyrinth 20 years later.

Gameplay

At each experience level the player character's hit point capacity increases; however, other character statistics are based on the blacksmith's cash-in advancement system. The hero gathers mithrill and plaques for the blacksmith. When the hero supplies him with a plaque and the requisite amount of mithrill, the blacksmith enhances the hero's weapon or armor by inlaying it with mithrill runes. Each plaque is emblazoned with a magic spell which, when transcribed onto armor or a weapon, augment's a specific statistic. The spell on a "Strength +5" plaque increments the hero's strength statistic by five. As long as the hero provides enough mithrill, the blacksmith can transcribe the same spell repeatedly to compound the effect. However, when the hero finds new armaments, he does not have to spend more mithrill to transcribe spells all over again. This is because the blacksmith can transform old equipment to match newly obtained equipment. For example: When the player finds a better sword, the blacksmith can reforge the hero's current sword to replicate the new one, while retaining all previous inscriptions. Even so, the blacksmith cannot convert one type of armament (such as a helmet) into another (such as a battle axe). As the player progresses through the game world, mithrill becomes more readily available. There is also a traditional level and experience system in place, but it only increases the character's HP.

Plot

The game follows the adventures of a hero who has been resurrected by the wizard Wart to defeat Cardice (sometimes transliterated as Kardis or Kardiss), the dark goddess of destruction.

Reception

The game received "generally favorable reviews" according to the review aggregation website Metacritic. Greg Orlando of NextGen said of the game: "Let the record show that this could have been a great one, but it falls far short of the mark". In Japan, Famitsu gave it a score of 30 out of 40.

References

External links

Role-playing video games
Action role-playing video games
Dreamcast games
Dreamcast-only games
Neverland (company) games
Record of Lodoss War
Single-player video games
Video games based on anime and manga
Video games developed in Japan
Video games with isometric graphics
2000 video games
2001 video games
Kadokawa Shoten games
Conspiracy Entertainment games
Crave Entertainment games